Megachile deceptoria is a species of bee in the family Megachilidae. It was described by Pérez in 1890.

References

Deceptoria
Insects described in 1890